Tyrone Holmes (born 15 April 1986) is a South African-born Scottish professional rugby union footballer.

Rugby Union career

Professional career

As part of his South African academy development with the RPC Rugby Performance Centre, Holmes trained with Toulon for four months. He then joined Northampton Saints academy for five months but on their relegation most of the academy players were cut and he returned to South Africa.

He played for the Stormers in Super Rugby and for Western Province in the Currie Cup and Vodacom Cup, as well as the Griquas and Cornish Pirates.

Holmes helped Western Province win the Vodacom Cup for the first time in 2012, he made nine appearances and scored two tries. He also played his first Super Rugby game later in the season. As a result of a loose forward injury crisis, Holmes debuted against the Lions on 30 June 2012. He started the game in the number 6 jersey and was replaced in the 52nd minute by Tiaan Liebenberg in a 27–17 Stormers win.

After the 2012 Currie Cup Premier Division season, he joined Italian National Championship of Excellence team Petrarca Rugby for one season.

Holmes then moved to Glasgow Warriors for the start of season 2013–14. He was part of the Glasgow side's 2014–2015 Pro12 league championship winning season. Following his release from Glasgow, Holmes signed for Newcastle Falcons in the Aviva Premiership from the 2016–17 season.

International career

Holmes is eligible to play for Scotland as his father was Scottish. His grandfather played for Peebles RFC.

He was named in the Scotland A squad for their match against England Saxons on 31 January 2014, helping them to a 13–13 draw. This confirmed his Scottish nationality under World Rugby rules.

The flanker received his first cap for the full Scotland national side against South Africa on 29 June 2014.

Coaching career

On 25 July 2017 it was announced that Holmes would begin a new role as the Strength and Conditioning Coach at Stade Niçois in France.

Holmes is now the Performance Coach of the Glasgow campus of the Scottish Rugby Academy.

References

External links

itsrugby.co.uk profile

1986 births
Living people
Sportspeople from Johannesburg
South African rugby union coaches
South African rugby union players
South African people of Scottish descent
Stormers players
Western Province (rugby union) players
Rugby union flankers
White South African people
South African people of British descent
Griquas (rugby union) players
Glasgow Warriors players
Cornish Pirates players
Expatriate rugby union players in Italy
Scotland international rugby union players
Scotland 'A' international rugby union players
Rugby union strength and conditioning coaches